The Online Film Critics Society Award for Best Original Screenplay is an annual film award given by the Online Film Critics Society to honor the best screenplay (written directly for the screen) of the year.

Awarded for the first time in 1975 as a special prize and starting the following year as a competitive prize, it was occasionally awarded in the editions of 1975-1977, 1980-1982, 1990-1992 and 2007, otherwise being replaced by the awards dedicated to the best screenplay, original and not original.

Winners

1990s

2000s

2010s

2020s

References

OFCS - Awards

Screenwriting awards for film